Laís Nunes de Oliveira (born November 3, 1992) is a Brazilian freestyle wrestler. She competed in the women's freestyle 63 kg event at the 2016 Summer Olympics, in which she was eliminated in the round of 32 by Hafize Şahin.

She represented Brazil at the 2020 Summer Olympics. She competed in the women's freestyle 62 kg event.

In 2022, she competed at the Yasar Dogu Tournament held in Istanbul, Turkey. She won one of the bronze medals in her event at the 2022 Pan American Wrestling Championships held in Acapulco, Mexico. A month later, she won the bronze medal in her event at the Matteo Pellicone Ranking Series 2022 held in Rome, Italy. She won the silver medal in her event at the 2022 Tunis Ranking Series event held in Tunis, Tunisia. She won the gold medal in her event at the 2022 South American Games held in Asunción, Paraguay.

She won one of the bronze medals in the women's 62kg event at the Grand Prix de France Henri Deglane 2023 held in Nice, France.

References

External links
 

1992 births
Living people
Brazilian female sport wrestlers
Olympic wrestlers of Brazil
Wrestlers at the 2016 Summer Olympics
Wrestlers at the 2020 Summer Olympics
Pan American Games medalists in wrestling
Pan American Games bronze medalists for Brazil
Wrestlers at the 2019 Pan American Games
Medalists at the 2019 Pan American Games
Pan American Wrestling Championships medalists
South American Games gold medalists for Brazil
South American Games medalists in wrestling
Competitors at the 2022 South American Games
21st-century Brazilian women